George Gwilt (1746–1807), also sometimes known as George Gwilt the Elder, was an English architect, particularly associated with buildings in and around London.

His sons George and Joseph were also architects, training in his office in Southwark; John Shaw was also a pupil of 'George Gwilt & Sons'.

Gwilt was architect surveyor for the county of Surrey. His buildings included:
Cobham Bridge (c. 1782)
Leatherhead Bridge (1782–83) rebuilding and enlarging the original late Medieval bridge
The Camden Chapel, Camberwell (1796–1798)
Horsemonger Lane Gaol and Sessions House, Newington Causeway, London (1791–1799 - demolished c.1880, with Sessions House being rebuilt)
The warehouses at West India Docks (1800–1804, a joint project with his son, George)

References

1746 births
1807 deaths
18th-century English architects
Architects from Surrey